Ilex cerasifolia is a species of the genus Ilex in the family Aquifoliaceae. It is native to Brazil, typically in Cerrado vegetation.

References

cerasifolia
Flora of Brazil
Flora of the Cerrado